Ellinaphididae is an extinct family of aphids in the order Hemiptera. There are about 13 genera and more than 40 described species in Ellinaphididae.

Palaeoaphididae is sometimes considered a subfamily (Palaeoaphidinae) of Palaeoaphididae.

Genera
These 13 genera belong to the family Ellinaphididae:

 † Annulaphis Shaposhnikov, 1979
 † Bugyrorinaphis Kania & Wegierek, 2008
 † Buriataphis Kania & Wegierek, 2008
 † Caudaphis Zhang, Zhang, Hou & Ma, 1989
 † Ellinaphis Shaposhnikov, 1979
 † Mongoaphis Kania & Wegierek, 2013
 † Rallotopaphis Kania & Wegierek, 2008
 † Rinorectuaphis Kania & Wegierek, 2008
 † Secusellinaphis Zyla & Wegierek, 2015
 † Transbaikalis Kania & Wegierek, 2008
 † Tsagaanaphis Kania & Wegierek, 2013
 † Unioaphis Kania & Wegierek, 2008
 † Vetellinaphis Zyla & Wegierek, 2015

References

Sternorrhyncha